Mauritius first participated at the Olympic Games in 1984, and has sent athletes to compete in every Summer Olympic Games since then.  The nation has never participated in the Winter Olympic Games. Mauritius also supported the American-led boycott of the 1980 Summer Olympics in Moscow.

At the 2008 Beijing Olympic Games, Bruno Julie secured Mauritius' first Olympic medal by reaching the bantamweight boxing semifinals and earning the bronze medal.

The National Olympic Committee for Mauritius was founded in 1971 by Ram Ruhee, who remained its Secretary General until his death in 2008. It was officially recognized by the International Olympic Committee in 1972.

Medals by Summer Games

Medals by sport

List of medalists

See also
 List of flag bearers for Mauritius at the Olympics
 :Category:Olympic competitors for Mauritius
 Mauritius at the Paralympics

References

External links
 
 
 

 
Olympics